Abdurrahim bey Asad bey oglu Hagverdiyev (17 May 1870 – 11 December 1933) was an Azerbaijani playwright, writer and cultural figure, stage director, politician, public figure, one of the five first Azeri Deputats of First Duma of Russian Empire, Deputat of Georgian Parliament, Creator of the Theatrical Writers Society in Azerbaijan, one of the collaborators of the magazine Molla Nasraddin, and Ambassador of Azerbaijan in the Republic of North Caucasus and Armenia.

Early life
Abdurrahim bey Asad bey oglu Hagverdiyev was born in the village of Aghbulaq near the Shusha suburb (then part of the Russian Empire, currently in the Nagorno-Karabakh region of Azerbaijan) to court reporter Asad bey Hagverdiyev and his wife Tukasban. His brother-in-law (his sister's husband) was a nobleman, Mamobey Mamayev. He had no children but adopted his sister's daughter, Fatma Xanum Malik-Abbas, as confirmed by the court of Azerbaijan).

After losing his father, Hagverdiyev lived with his uncle's family, and later returned to his mother, who had married a local official. He studied at a two-year Russian-Muslim school, then took up Russian at Malik-Hagnazarov's School. In 1884 he enrolled in a seven-year Shusha Realschule. In his final year, Hagverdiyev transferred to the Realschule in Tiflis. At age 14, he became acquainted with theatre on seeing an adaptation of Mirza Fatali Akhundov's play Khirs guldurbasan. Upon graduating Hagverdiyev was admitted to the Saint Petersburg Institute of Transportation Engineering and attended lectures in Oriental Studies at the Saint Petersburg University as a visiting student. In his eight years in Saint Petersburg, Hagverdiyev also excelled in French, which helped him learn traditions of Western European drama.

Literary contributions and stage directing
In 1892, Hagverdiyev wrote his first dramatic piece, a comedy, Yeyarsan gaz atini, gorarsan lazzatini. The book almost immediately was published thanks to benevolent Muslim societies in the Russian capital. While in St. Petersburg, Hagverdiyev wrote the first epic tragedy in the Azeri language, Daghilan Tifag ("The Breaking of Unity", 1896). In 1899, he returned to Shusha and took up theatre directing while continuing to write plays, such as Bakhtsiz Javan ("The Unlucky Young Man", 1900) and Pari Jadu ("Nymph Magic", 1901). In 1907, Hagverdiyev completed his historical tragedy Agha Mohammad Shah Qajar, which brought him great fame. In 1906, he began writing for the satirical magazine Molla Nasraddin. In 1908, he directed Azerbaijani composer Uzeyir Hajibeyov's opera Leyli and Majnun. In the years 1911 through 1916 he lived in Aghdam, dedicating himself mostly to writing fiction. Over the next two years he lived and worked in Tiflis as a reporter for the local Russian-language newspaper, and translated Russian writers such as Gogol and Ostrovsky, European writers Shakespeare, Molière, Schiller and others into Azerbaijani.

Political career
In 1905, Hagverdiyev was appointed to Shusha's municipal government. In 1906, he was elected to the State Duma of the Russian Empire (the Russian Imperial legislative assembly) as a representative of the Elisabethpol Governorate and moved to St. Petersburg. After the government's dissolution, Hagverdiyev returned to the insurance industry and later a waterway transportation company. In these years, he often travelled to Iran and Central Asia.

In 1918, Hagverdiyev, who lived in Tiflis at the time and worked as a court officer, was appointed representative of Georgia's Azeri community in the Parliament of the newly formed Democratic Republic of Georgia. Concurrently he taught at an Azeri-language secondary school in Tiflis. In 1919 he accepted an invitation from the Azerbaijan Democratic Republic government to serve as the Azerbaijani consul in Dagestan, and later in Armenia.

After Azerbaijan's Sovietization in 1920, Hagverdiyev was appointed head of the department for theatres in the People's Commissariat for Enlightening an early Soviet analogy to the Ministry of Education). In 1921–1931 he worked in the Oriental Studies department of the Azerbaijan State University. From 1923–1935, he headed the Azerbaijan Society for Scientific Research, of which he was a co-founder. In 1924, he was elected Corresponding Member of the Russian Academy of Sciences. In 1929, he received the title of an Honoured art worker of Azerbaijan. In 1930–1932 Hagverdiyev was Chair of the Writers' Union of Azerbaijan. He died in Baku in 1933.

Legacy
Hagverdiyev's 49-year-old career in literature was a successful continuation to dramaturgic traditions initiated by Mirza Fatali Akhundov in the early-to-mid 19th century. In his works and articles Hagverdiyev communicated themes like the necessity for mass education and respect for human rights. His tragedies were true depictions of contemporary problems. Given his education, knowledge of Western and Eastern cultures and refined manners, Hagverdiyev was widely known and loved by Azerbaijanis, setting an example to subsequent generations of writers. On January 31, 2020, a presidential order was issued by Ilham Aliyev to celebrate the 150th Anniversary of Hagverdiyev's birth.

References

External links

 Plays by Abdurrahim bey Hagverdiyev online. Gutenberg.aznet.org.

1870 births
1933 deaths
Writers from Shusha
People from Elizavetpol Governorate
Members of the 1st State Duma of the Russian Empire
Azerbaijani dramatists and playwrights
Azerbaijani theatre directors
Azerbaijani translators
Translators to Azerbaijani
Politicians of the Russian Empire
Azerbaijan Democratic Republic politicians
Politicians from Georgia (country)
Soviet translators
Soviet dramatists and playwrights
Male dramatists and playwrights
Soviet male writers
20th-century male writers
19th-century translators
20th-century translators
19th-century Azerbaijani dramatists and playwrights
20th-century Azerbaijani dramatists and playwrights
19th-century male writers
Ambassadors of Azerbaijan to Armenia
Shusha Realni School alumni
Honored Art Workers of the Azerbaijan SSR